Mikhail Petrovich Tsiselsky; May 20, 1909 – November 3, 1989 was a Ukrainian Soviet naval pilot during World War II who was awarded the title Hero of the Soviet Union.

Biography
He finished incomplete secondary school and specialized technical school. He lived in Ussuriysk from 1928. He repaired steam locomotives, and became a member of the All-Union Communist Party (bolsheviks) in 1932.

Tsiselsky joined the Red Army's Fourth Zabaykalsky  cavalry regiment in 1932. He completed aircraft maintenance training at Irkutsky in 1934 and subsequently served in the Byelorussian command as an aircraft technician. He completed a naval aviation course at Yeisky in 1936 and then served in the Black Sea Fleet's naval aviation branch.

His first combat mission of the German-Soviet War took place on June 22, 1941. He participated in the destruction of a tank battalion in the Gros-Libental-Odessa district. On September 23, Tsiselsky and his unit sunk a heavy troop transport on the Dniester Liman and killing hundreds of Nazi soldiers and officers, as well as 15 tanks and 20 other vehicles in the Perekop-Sevastopol district in a separate action. For great services to the Motherland, Tsiselsky was awarded his first Order of the Red Banner.

 
Tsiselsky was a Navigator in a bomber squadron of the Baltic Fleet's 12th Guards Aviation Regiment during the German-Soviet War and performed 396 successful combat missions for air reconnaissance and bombardment of enemy ships and troops. He destroyed three troop transports of 11000 tonnes displacement, several vehicle landing craft, motorboats,  motor torpedo boat, 31 tanks, 20 cars, fuel storage tanks and 4 transport aircraft. He personally downed three fascist aircraft.

March 6, 1945 he was recognized as a Hero of Soviet Union by decree of the Supreme Soviet for exemplary fulfilment of battle orders on front of the German-Soviet War, and his fortitude and heroism.

Tsiselsky was demobilized as a Major in 1948. During 1948-1955 he worked as a kolkhoz head in a native village. He lived in Kiev from 1955 and worked as a foreman at the "Krasny Rezinschik" plant for the production of mechanical rubber goods.

He died on 3 November 1989 and was buried in Kiev.

Awards
 Hero of the Soviet Union Medal of Gold Star (№ 5083, 6 March 1945)
 Order of Lenin (№29282)
 Order of the October Revolution (№40988)
 Order of the Red Banner, twice (№5667 and №27662)
 Order of the Patriotic War, 1st Class (№ 478013)
 Order of the Red Star (№3737020)
 campaign and jubilee medals

Further reading
 «Zorenosci». The book about Hero of the Soviet Union, who was born in the Cherkassy region. — Dnipropetrovsk, "Promin": 1971.
 «The pilots of the Baltic are in the sky». The battle history of naval aviation of Baltic Fleet during the German-Soviet War. Memoirs, essais. — Tallinn, "Eesti Raamat": 1974.
 «The wings of  the Baltic: Articles and memoirs».. Golubev V.F., Kalinichenko A.F. - compilers. — Kaliningrad "Publishing house": 1979.
 "The Gold Stars of Primorye". — Vladivostok: 1983, p. 236—239.
 Kuznetsov I.I. "The Residents's of Irkutsk Gold Stars". — Irkutsk: 1982, p. 299—303.
 "They defended a peace". — Dnipropetrovsk, "Promin":  1985, p. 336—338.

External links

 Biography at warheroes.ru 
 "The Soldiers of Victory"
 "Necropolis of Kiev"

1909 births
1989 deaths
People from Cherkasy Oblast
People from Kiev Governorate
Communist Party of the Soviet Union members
Heroes of the Soviet Union
Recipients of the Order of Lenin
Recipients of the Order of the Red Banner
Ukrainian aviators
Ukrainian people of World War II
Soviet military personnel of World War II
Soviet Navy officers
Soviet World War II pilots